Clayton Paul Alderfer (September 1, 1940 - October 30, 2015) was an American psychologist and consultant known for further developing Maslow's hierarchy of needs.

Biography 
Born in Sellersville, Pennsylvania, Alderfer obtained his BA in psychology in 1962 at Yale University, where he also obtained his PhD in psychology 1966. In 1977 he also obtained certification by the American Board of Professional Psychology (ABPP).

After graduation Alderfer started his academic career at Cornell University in 1966. In 1968 he returned to Yale University, where he was researcher, lecturer and program director in the Department of Administrative Sciences until 1992. In 1992 he moved to Rutgers University, where he acted as the program director for the Organizational Psychology department at the Graduate School of Applied and Professional Psychology for 12 years. In the new millennium he started his own consultancy firm.

Work 
Alderfer further developed Maslow's hierarchy of needs by categorizing the hierarchy into his ERG theory (Existence, Relatedness and Growth).

Selected publications 
 Alderfer, Clayton P., An Empirical Test of a New Theory of Human Needs; Organizational Behaviour and Human Performance, volume 4, issue 2, pp. 142–175, May 1969
 Alderfer, C. P., Existence, Relatedness, and Growth; Human Needs in Organizational Settings, New York: Free Press, 1972
 Alderfer, C. P., "A critique of Salancik and Pfeffer's examination of need-satisfaction theories, Administrative Science Quarterly, 22 (1977), 658-669
Alderfer, C. P.  The Methodology of Organizational Diagnosis, Professional Psychology, 1980, 11, 459–468.
Alderfer, C. P.  An Intergroup Perspective on Group Dynamics.  In J. W. Lorsch (editor), Handbook of Organizational Behavior, 1987, 190–222.
Alderfer, C. P.  Consulting to Underbounded Systems, C. P. Alderfer and C. L. Cooper (editors), Advances in Experiential Social Processes, 1980, 2, 267–295.
Alderfer, C. P.  Improving organizational communication through long-term intergroup intervention, Journal of Applied Behavioral Science, 1977, 13, 193–210.
Alderfer, C. P. and Brown, L. D.  Learning from changing, 47–56,129-141.
Alderfer, C.P. (2005).  The Five Laws of Group and Intergroup Dynamics.

References

External links 
  Clayton Paul Alderfer

1940 births
2015 deaths
20th-century American psychologists
Motivational theories
People from Sellersville, Pennsylvania